Lauren Anne Asher (born 9 October 1996, Denver) is an American equestrian athlete and business woman. She competed at the FEI North American Continental Championships in 2014, 2015 and 2017. Asher won an individual silver medal during the Championships in 2017 and won all U25 classes during the Nations Cup at the Global Dressage Festival in 2019 with her horse West Side. Asher runs her horse business in both Wellington, Florida and Amsterdam, The Netherlands.

References

1996 births
Living people
American female equestrians
American dressage riders
People from Denver
Sportspeople from Denver
American expatriate sportspeople in the Netherlands
American people of Dutch descent